Gaer Wood is a Site of Special Scientific Interest (SSSI), noted for its biological characteristics, in Monmouthshire, south east Wales.

Geography
The woodland is privately owned.

Wildlife and ecology
As with other woodland in the Wye Valley Area of Outstanding Natural Beauty, Gaer Wood contains many local and rare tree species. The main species found in the wood are common ash (Fraxinus excelsior), field maple (Acer campestre) and wych elm (Ulmus glabra), along with localised occurrences of beech (Fagus sylvatica).

References

Forests and woodlands of Monmouthshire
Sites of Special Scientific Interest in Monmouthshire
Sites of Special Scientific Interest notified in 1981